Saint Simpert (died 13 October 807) was an abbot, bishop, and confessor of the late-8th and early-9th centuries, and was supposedly the nephew of Charlemagne. He was educated at Murbach Abbey in Alsace, where he took the Benedictine habit and was elected abbot. In 778, he was appointed bishop of Augsburg by Charlemagne. He consolidated and strengthened the jurisdiction of his bishopric and lived alternately at Neuburg an der Donau, at Staffelsee Abbey, and at Augsburg.

He rebuilt the Basilica of St. Afra and others. While he was bishop, he remained abbot of Murbach, ruling at the same time the diocese and the monastery. He died on 13 October 807, and was buried at St Afra's church. Since 1624, he has been a secondary patron of Augsburg, his cultus having been approved in 1468.

References

Sources
 Holweck, F. G., A Biographical Dictionary of the Saints. 1924.

External links
 http://www.santiebeati.it/dettaglio/74135

807 deaths
German Roman Catholic saints
Roman Catholic bishops of Augsburg
8th-century Christian saints
History of Augsburg
Year of birth unknown